This is the list of episodes for The Late Late Show in 2015 with guest hosts. Guest hosts were scheduled to helm the program between the end of Craig Ferguson's tenure as host in December 2014 and the beginning of James Corden's tenure on March 23, 2015.  In this transitional period, the show continued to be co-produced by Worldwide Pants and the staff was mostly made up of holdovers from Ferguson's era. The off-camera announcer continued to be Shadoe Stevens, except for the week of New York shows, where another announcer was used. The executive producer remained Peter Lassally, however the show was produced by newcomer Jeff Stilson, formerly of The Daily Show with Jon Stewart, Late Show with David Letterman and Lopez Tonight.  The writing staff consisted of Stilson along with Ferguson-era writers Jonathan Morano, Bob Oschack, Ben Stout and Joe Strazzullo. Other continuing staff included Catherine Hoeven as supervising producer and Tim Mancinelli as director. New shows were aired from January 5, 2015 until March 6, 2015 with repeats of guest hosted programs being run during the final two weeks prior to Corden's premiere.

The show was filmed using the old Craig Ferguson set at CBS Television City in Los Angeles, but on a separate soundstage to allow The Late Late Show with James Corden to begin constructing their set in Stage 56. The fireplace component was removed, as were the props that sat on Ferguson's desk, and the door previously used by Secretariat, the pantomime horse, remained closed, and the set used a black vinyl surface floor. Geoff Peterson, Ferguson's animatronic sidekick, did not continue on the program but his podium remained and was used during several weeks by sidekicks, for instance when either CBS Daytime game show host served as guest host, the podium was used by that game show's respective announcer, who served as his sidekick. A different, shorter, and instrumental theme song was used for the program played over a montage of time lapse images of Los Angeles. For the week of programs recorded in New York City, the show was broadcast from Studio 57 at the CBS Broadcast Center, which is the home of CBS This Morning, without a studio audience. The opening credit sequence consisted of a montage of stock time-lapse videography of New York City scenes while the theme music remained the same. The show used the same logo as Ferguson's show except with Ferguson's name removed.

The Talk aired a nighttime edition in the Late Late Show timeslot for one week which was taped in its home studio and another week of Late Late Shows was filmed in New York City instead of Los Angeles. As the Late Late Show set in Studio 56 set in CBS Television City, Los Angeles, was not being used for these two weeks the producers were able to pre-record two weeks of programs for broadcast in late February and early March which, in turn, gave CBS more time to strike the old set from Studio 56 and erect a new one for The Late Late Show with James Corden, also giving Corden and his team additional time to rehearse and do advance taping of segments on their new set prior to Corden's March 23 premiere.

This was not the first time a major late-night US talk show has experienced an interregnum period. In 1962, after Jack Paar's departure and prior to Johnny Carson beginning his 30-year tenure as host, The Tonight Show underwent a period of approximately six months during which a number of temporary guest hosts were used. From September to December 2004, the Late Late Show had a series of guest hosts in a series of on-air auditions to replace departed host Craig Kilborn. The longest interregnum was from 1996 until 2000 for NBC's Later, which had a 'guest host of the week' format between Greg Kinnear and Cynthia Garrett as the timeslot was a low priority for NBC to fill with a permanent host.

Hosts

2015

January

February

March

References

External links
 The Late Late Show at CBS

Episodes (2015 guest hosts)
2015 American television seasons
Lists of American non-fiction television series episodes
Lists of variety television series episodes